Scopula anatreces is a species of moth of the family Geometridae. It was described by Prout in 1920. It is endemic to Taiwan.

References

Moths described in 1920
anatreces
Moths of Taiwan
Taxa named by Louis Beethoven Prout